William David "Bill" Perez (born September 10, 1947) is an American businessman who was the chief executive officer of Wm. Wrigley Jr. Company. He had earlier served in a similar capacity at Nike, Inc. Prior to that, Perez had risen to become the chief executive officer at S. C. Johnson & Son.

Early life
William David Perez was born on September 10, 1947 in Akron, Ohio. He went to high school at Western Reserve Academy, a private coeducational boarding school in Hudson, Ohio, before attending Cornell University, where he was a member of Sigma Alpha Epsilon fraternity. In addition, Perez has a graduate degree from the Thunderbird School of Global Management.

Business career
Perez worked at S. C. Johnson from 1970 to 2004.  He spent eight years as president and CEO of S. C. Johnson & Son. On December 28, 2004, Perez succeeded Phil Knight as CEO of Nike, Inc and served from December 2004 until his announcement on January 23, 2006 that he was resigning from Nike due to disagreements with Knight over how to run the company. Perez received $8 million in severance pay.

On October 3, 2006, Perez succeeded William Wrigley Jr. II as CEO of Wm. Wrigley Jr. Company, the world's largest chewing-gum manufacturer. He was the first person outside the Wrigley family to head the century-old company. He also joined Wrigley's board of directors. On January 11, 2010, Perez joined Greenhill & Co. as a senior advisor.

Positions held on boards of directors
Johnson Outdoors (2018 to present)
Whirlpool Corporation (2009 to present)
Johnson & Johnson (2007 to present)
Campbell Soup Company (2009 to 2012)
Kellogg Company (2000 to 2006)
Nike, Inc. (2004 to 2006)
The May Department Stores Company (1998-2004)
Hallmark Cards

References

External links
S.C. Johnson CEO Perez steps down to lead Nike The Business Journal.
Nike: Can Perez Fill Knight's Shoes? Businessweek.
Inside the Coup at Nike Businessweek.
Why Wrigley and Perez Need Each Other Businessweek.
Curiously Strong Teamwork Businessweek.
For Wrigley, CEO Perez Is a Life Saver CNBC Mad Money.
Kings of the Mountain Hispanicbusiness.com
Mars shows door to Wrigley CEO Chicago Tribune.
 The Curious Case of Bill Perez Spencer Stuart Case Study.

1947 births
American chief executives of food industry companies
American corporate directors
American retail chief executives
Cornell University alumni
Living people
Thunderbird School of Global Management alumni
Western Reserve Academy alumni